Dzerzhinsky is a town in Moscow Oblast, Russia, located on the bank of the Moskva River,  south of the city of Lyubertsy. The western part of Dzerzhinsky borders with the territory of the federal city of  Moscow. Population:

History

St. Nicholas Monastery

The settlement has grown around the Ugresha Monastery which stands at the heart of the modern town. The monastery has been one of the richest in Russia since the 17th century when Tsar Alexis and Patriarch Nikon built their palaces on the grounds. It was greatly expanded in the 19th century, under the supervision of St. Pimen of Ugreshi. One of the new churches in the monastery is dedicated to St. Pimen. The walled area of the monastery has several picturesque ponds.

Modern history
After the October Revolution of 1917, in an effort to fight child homelessness, the monastery was reorganized into a children labor colony in 1920. The colony was later transformed into a labor commune by Felix Dzerzhinsky. In 1921, the colony spread outside the boundaries of the former monastery and an official settlement was established. In 1938, it was granted urban-type settlement status, just after the commune had dissolved. Town status was granted to Dzerzhinsky in 1981.

On March 31, 2006, Viktor Dorkin, the head of the Local Government Board, was shot and killed. Investigation stated that he was assassinated because of his professional career. One killer was detained before May 5, 2006.

Administrative and municipal status
Within the administrative divisions framework, it is incorporated as Dzerzhinsky Town Under Oblast Jurisdiction—an administrative unit with the status equal to that of the districts. As a municipal division, Dzerzhinsky Town Under Oblast Jurisdiction is incorporated as Dzerzhinsky Urban Okrug.

Economy
The town's industry comprises Heat and Power Central #22 (CHP-22), a reinforced concrete constructions factory, and military chemical industry.

Transportation
Lyubertsy–Dzerzhinsky railway is used for cargo transportation only. The passenger line was dismantled due to inefficiency.

Culture and education
Six secondary schools and one professional school operate in the town, as well as a musical school and a school of arts.  Dzerzhinsky has a local newspaper,"Ugreshskiye Vesti" ("Ugresh news").

Notable people
 
 
Viktor Pimushin (born 1955), Russian retired professional footballer
Alexey Pleshakov (born 1954), Head of the local government board

International relations

Twin towns and sister cities
Dzerzhinsky is twinned with:

References

Notes

 Dzerzhinsky mayor shot dead by two killers, Wikinews 
 Police in Moscow Oblast arrest one suspect in mayor's murder, Radio Free Europe/Radio Liberty: Newsline 06-05-05

Sources

External links

Official website of Dzerzhinsky 
Dzerzhinsky Business Directory 

Cities and towns in Moscow Oblast
Naukograds